Horace Van Vaultz Jr. (born May 21, 1955) is an American serial killer. 

He was arrested on November 15, 2019, and charged with the 1981 murder of Selena Keough, 20, in Montclair, California, and the 1986 murder of Mary Duggan, 22, in Burbank, California. The cases had gone unsolved for decades until a DNA breakthrough exposed his involvement. The same DNA also proved Vaultz's responsibility in the 1986 murder of Janna Rowe, 25, in Ventura, California, a murder he was originally arrested for but later acquitted in 1988.

A search of Vaultz's house in Bakersfield revealed a collection of numerous photographs of young women and teenage girls, some of which police suspect were murdered by Vaultz. Two of the women in the photographs have been identified and confirmed to be still alive.

Vaultz was found guilty on two counts of first degree murder on August 18, 2022. He was subsequently sentenced to two consecutive terms of life in prison without parole on September 19, 2022. Vaultz maintains he is innocent.

See also 
 List of serial killers in the United States

References 

1955 births
1981 murders in the United States
1986 murders in the United States
20th-century American criminals
American male criminals
American people convicted of murder
American people convicted of sexual assault
American prisoners sentenced to life imprisonment
American rapists
American serial killers
Criminals from California
Criminals from Los Angeles
Living people
Male serial killers
People acquitted of murder
People convicted of murder by California
People from Burbank, California
Prisoners sentenced to life imprisonment by California
Violence against women in the United States